The 2006 Westminster City Council election took place on 4 May 2006 to elect members of Westminster City Council in London, England. The whole council was up for election and the Conservative Party remained in control of the council with no seat changes between the Conservatives and Labour.

Election result

|}

Ward results

Abbey Road

Bayswater

Bryanston and Dorset Square

Church Street

Churchill

Harrow Road

Hyde Park

Knightsbridge and Belgravia

Lancaster Gate

Little Venice

Maida Vale

Marylebone High Street

Queen's Park

Regent's Park

St James's

Tachbrook

Vincent Square

Warwick

West End

Westbourne

References

2006
2006 London Borough council elections